Pure Moods is the first United States release of a series of compilation albums of new-age music released by Virgin Records. The original was titled Moods – A contemporary Soundtrack and released in the UK in 1991. This was followed by Moods 2 in 1992. The series focuses on the genres of new-age, ambient, world music, and to a lesser extent, downtempo, trip-hop and smooth jazz. Several artists are featured regularly throughout the series such as Massive Attack, Moby, Delerium, Enigma, Enya, Adiemus, Sacred Spirit and Yanni.

The original volume of the series was initially promoted and sold by direct response television commercials. The first volume was initially released in 1994, with a different track listing from the 1997 re-release. There are twelve albums released by Virgin Records in the series — five "main entry" albums and six spin-off albums (Celtic, Scottish, Instrumental, Romantic, Gregorian and Christmas). Scottish Moods stands alone as an album featuring a single performer, David Methen and The Munros, while all the others are albums featuring multiple artists.

Track listings

Pure Moods (original 1994 release)

Pure Moods (1997 re-release)

Release Date: April 1, 1997
Label / Catalog #: Virgin Records US: 42186
UPC: 7 24384 21862 1

Instrumental Moods (original 1995 UK release)

Release Date: November 6, 1995
Label / Catalogue Number: Virgin Records UK: VTCD 65
UPC: 7 24384 11232 5

Cinema Moods (1995)
Release Date: 1995

Gregorian Moods (1997)
Release Date: July 1997
Label / Catalogue Number: Virgin Records UK: VTCD 171

Celtic Moods (1997)
Release Date: November 11, 1997
Label / Catalog #: Virgin Records US: 44951

Instrumental Moods (1998)
Release Date: February 24, 1998
Label / Catalog #: Virgin Records US: 45397

Christmas Moods (1998)
Release Date: October 20, 1998
Label / Catalog #: Virgin Records US: 46753

Pure Moods II (1998)
Release Date: November 17, 1998
Label / Catalog #: Virgin Records US: 46796

Scottish Moods (1999)
Release Date: February 23, 1999
Label / Catalog #: Virgin Records US: 46986

Pure Moods III (2001)
Release Date: February 6, 2001
Label / Catalog #: Virgin Records US: 50935

Pure Moods IV (2002)
Release Date: October 1, 2002
Label / Catalog #: Virgin Records US: 12082

Romantic Moods (2002)
Release Date: 2002

Pure Moods: Celestial Celebration (2004)
Release Date: February 24, 2004
Label / Catalog #: Virgin Records US: 96797

References

External links
Pure Moods collection promo on YouTube
Pure Moods, Vol.2 on AllMusic

Compilation album series
New-age compilation albums
1994 albums